Céline, sometimes spelled Celine, is a French female first name of Latin origin, coming from Caelīna, the feminine form of the Roman cognomen Caelīnus, meaning "heavenly". Its equivalent in Spanish, Italian, and Portuguese is Celina. Céline was frequently chosen as a first name in honour of two Gallo-Roman saints closely associated with the beginnings of the French nation:

Saint Céline of Laon, mother of St Rémy, and Saint Céline of Meaux, a companion of St Geneviève; the feast day for both is 21 October.

Céline as a single name may refer to the French writer Louis-Ferdinand Céline, author of Journey to the End of the Night.

People with the first name
 Celine Al Haddad (born 2001), Lebanese footballer
 Céline Arnauld (1885–1952), writer associated with Dadaism
 Celine Axelos (1902–1992), Egyptian poet
 Céline Bara (Céline Szumigay, born 1978), French pornographic film actress of Mauritian origin
 Céline Baril (born 1953), Canadian artist and film director
 Céline Bonnier (born 1965), French Canadian actress
 Céline Boucher (born 1945), Canadian artist
 Céline Buckens (born 1996), Belgian-British actress
 Celine Byrne (born 1977), Irish soprano
 Céline Carzo, French singer who represented Luxembourg in the Eurovision Song Contest 1990
 Céline Cassone, French-born ballerina
 Céline Couderc (born 1983), female freestyle swimmer
 Céline Degrange (born 1978), French Olympic gymnast
 Céline Dion (born 1968), Canadian singer, occasional songwriter, actress and entrepreneur
 Mary Celine Fasenmyer (1906–1996), American nun and mathematician (often referred to as Sister Celine)
 Céline Figard (1976–1995), French student murdered during a visit to the United Kingdom in December 1995
 Céline Galipeau, Canadian news anchor
 Céline Gittens, Trinidadian ballet dancer
 Céline Gounder, American physician 
 Celine Helgemo (born 1995), Norwegian singer
 Céline Hervieux-Payette (born 1941), former Leader of the Opposition in the Canadian Senate
 Celine Cris Horwang (born 1980), Thai actress, model, singer and TV personality
 Céline Laporte (born 1984), athlete
 Céline Lebrun (born 1976), French judoka
 Céline Lomez (born 1953), Canadian actress and singer
 Céline Monsarrat, French actress
 Celine Rattray (born 1975), film producer
 Céline Scheen (born 1976), Belgian operatic soprano
 Celine Sivertsen (born 1993), Norwegian handball player
 Céline Yandza, Congolese politician
 Céline Yoda (born 1958), Burkinabé politician

Pseudonyms and fictional characters
 Celine Verans, a minor character mentioned only by Mr. Rochester in Charlotte Brontë's classic novel Jane Eyre.
 Celine is the name of the female Protagonist in the films "Before Sunrise", "Before Sunset" and "Before Midnight", played by Julie Delpy.
 Celine Jules, a character from the PlayStation video game Star Ocean: The Second Story.

As a surname

Pseudonyms and fictional characters
 Louis-Ferdinand Céline, the pen name of Louis-Ferdinand Destouches (1894–1961), a French writer and doctor
 Hagbard Celine, character in the Illuminatus trilogy of books by Robert Shea and Robert Anton Wilson

Other
Celine (brand), formerly spelled Céline

References

Surnames
Given names
French feminine given names